Graham Edward Urwin (born 15 February 1949) is an English former footballer who played as an outside right in the Football League for Darlington and in non-league football for South Shields. Urwin appeared only once for Darlington's first team, playing the whole of the Fourth Division match at home to Southend United on 21 October 1967 as replacement for regular winger Don Ratcliffe.

References

1949 births
Living people
Footballers from South Shields
English footballers
Association football wingers
Darlington F.C. players
South Shields F.C. (1936) players
English Football League players